Limits is a collection of short stories and essays by science fiction author Larry Niven, originally published in 1985.

 "The Lion in his Attic" - Seventy-six years after Atlantis drowned, a sorceress and a prince learn to their dismay that not all lions eat red meat.
 "Spirals"
 "A Teardrop Falls" - In his youth, Hilary Gage had fought men and studied the ravages of Berserkers. As a machine, he terraformed planets and lay in wait . . . .
 "Talisman"
 "Flare Time"
 "The Locusts"
 "Yet Another Modest Proposal" At last, a solution to the problem of radioactive wastes that costs nothing and yields an immodest profit.
 "More Tales from Draco Tavern"
 "Limits" - Two aliens fascinated by man's fondness for defining boundaries decide to make sure he doesn't get out of the habit.

1985 short story collections
Short story collections by Larry Niven
Del Rey books